The Abominable Showman is the fourth solo album by British singer-songwriter Nick Lowe, released in 1983.

The album was out of print for two decades until being reissued on CD and vinyl by Yep Roc Records on 14 July 2017. The reissue contained three bonus tracks.

Track listing
Note: The packaging of the YepRoc reissue omits mention of "Pet You and Hold You" as a bonus track.

Personnel
 Nick Lowe – bass, guitar, lead vocals
 James Eller – bass
 Bobby Irwin – drums, backing vocals
 Paul Carrack – keyboards, backing vocals, duet vocals on "Wish You Were Here"
 Martin Belmont – guitar

Other credits
 Robert Kirby – string arrangements
 Carlene Carter and Simon Climie – harmonies and harmonics on "Time Wounds All Heels"
 Pete Marsh – backing vocals on "Paid The Price" and "Tanque-Rae"
 George Rains – The Abominable Showman
 Keith Morris – photography

Production
The album was recorded at Rockfield Studios, Wales and Ampro Studio, London.
 Producer – Roger Bechirian with Nick Lowe
 Engineers – Roger Bechirian, Paul Cobbold and Paul Bass

Singles 
Three songs off this album were released as singles:

"Raging Eyes" / "Tanque-Rae" ("Raging Eyes" was recorded in October 1981)
"Cool Reaction" (Promo only)
"Wish You Were Here" / "How Do You Talk To An Angel"

Notes

External links
 

1983 albums
Nick Lowe albums
Albums arranged by Robert Kirby
Albums produced by Nick Lowe
Albums produced by Roger Bechirian
F-Beat Records albums
Columbia Records albums
Albums recorded at Rockfield Studios